Nippert is a surname. Notable people with the surname include:

Carl L. Nippert (1852–1904), German-American engineer and politician
Dustin Nippert (born 1981), American baseball player
Louis Nippert (1903–1992), American businessman
Louise Nippert (1911–2012), American businesswoman

See also
Nippert Stadium